The 1st Latin American Music Awards was held on October 8, 2015, at the Dolby Theatre in Los Angeles, California. It was broadcast live on Telemundo. The nominations were announced on September 2, 2015, on Telemundo's website. Nicky Jam leads the nominees with six nominations. Lucero was announced as a host on October 2, 2015. Rashel Diaz, Boris Izaguirre, Christian Ramirez, Kika Rocha, and Caeli were all announced co-hosts of the pre-show on the same day.

Presenters

Performances

Gloria Trevi
Gerardo Ortiz
Il Volo
Gerardo Ortiz
Lil Jon
Yandel
Natalie La Rose
Jencarlos Canela
Gerardo Ortíz
Maluma
Luis Coronel
CD9
Paulina Rubio
Daddy Yankee
Jesse & Joy
Yuri
Reik
Farruko
Fonseca
Shaggy

Winners and nominees

Multiple nominations and awards

References

External links 

 Official site in Facebook
 Official site in Instagram
 Official site in Twitter

2015 music awards
2015 in Latin music
2015 in Los Angeles